John of Conza or Compsa (fl. ca. 615/618), was a native of Compsa (modern Conza della Campania). Taking advantage of the turmoil in the Exarchate of Ravenna and the preoccupation of the Byzantine emperor Heraclius with the Persian war in the East, he attacked and captured Naples, becoming its second duke. His rebellion was put down by the exarch of Ravenna, Eleutherius. Consinus and many of his followers were killed in the process.

Sources 
 
 

610s deaths
7th-century dukes of Naples
7th-century Byzantine people
Byzantine rebels
Byzantines killed in battle
Exarchate of Ravenna
Year of birth unknown